Petar Pavlović (Požarevac, Serbia, 28 June 1864 – Belgrade, Kingdom of Yugoslavia, 5 August 1938) was a Serbian geologist, also a member of the Serbian Academy of Sciences and Arts, lecturer at the Grandes écoles and a long-time director of the Museum of Natural History, Belgrade.

Biography 
Petar Pavlović was born in Požarevac to Colonel Stojko Pavlović and Jelena "Lena" Lunjevica, daughter of Nikola Lunjevica, the Serbian revolutionary leader. After graduating from Belgrade's Grandes écoles, he went abroad to pursue further studies in geology and palaeontology. Upon his return to Serbia he was offered the post of director of the Museum of Natural History.

Geology in Serbia 
The study of modern geology in Serbia began to develop in the first half of the 19th century mainly for two reasons: the endeavours of Prince Miloš Obrenović to expand the national economy (including mining) and the interest shown by European scientists for a country, newly liberated from the Ottoman yoke. When in 1880 Jovan Žujović became the professor of geology and mineralogy at the Grandes écoles in Belgrade, as the first Serbian geologist who studied in Belgrade and Paris, the development of geology in Serbia was strongly increased. Zujović's successors: Sava Urošević (mineralogy, petrology), Svetolik Radovanović (palaeontology), Petar Pavlović (palaeontology), Vladimir Petković (regional geology), Jelenko Mihailović (seismology) and others continued geological investigations in Serbia.

See also
 Jovan Žujović
 Jovan Cvijić
 Stevan Karamata
 Marko Leko
 Aleksandar Popović Sandor
 Vladimir K. Petković

References 

Serbian geologists
1864 births
1938 deaths
Serbian paleontologists
Paleontology in Serbia